Kenneth Gordon (born 5 January 1982), better known by his stage name Tyler James, is an English singer and songwriter signed to Island Records.

James's debut single, "Why Do I Do?", made an appearance on the UK Singles Chart in 2004, peaking at number 25. His debut studio album, The Unlikely Lad, was released through Island Records on 29 August 2005.

In 2012 James appeared as a contestant on the first series of The Voice UK, making it through to the live final of the show, eventually finishing as the joint runner-up behind series winner Leanne Mitchell. Following his success on The Voice UK, James released his second album, A Place I Go, which peaked at number 47 on the UK Albums Chart.

Music career

2001–2005: The Unlikely Lad
After guesting house on the underground R&B track "Wilder" by Stargate in 2001, which became a nightclub favourite in London, James got his first taste of celebrity. In 2002, after touring around the UK's bars, pubs and clubs; evolving his sound and performance, James had garnered enough reputation to be hailed as "The British answer to Justin Timberlake" by The Face magazine, whilst NME hailed him as "one to watch".

Tyler James was signed to Island Records in 2003 after they heard a demo tape featuring his future debut single, "Why Do I Do?". The reggae flavoured song made the 'A' playlist on BBC Radio 2, and entered the UK Singles Chart at No. 25. In early 2004, James toured the UK with best friend Amy Winehouse.

In early 2005, James toured with Natasha Bedingfield and in the spring of 2005, his second single "Foolish" was released, which reached No. 16 on the UK chart. The success of the song saw his first appearance on BBC Television's Top of the Pops. July 2005, James' third single was released. Originally a No. 1 hit for White Town in, James covered "Your Woman". "Your Woman" reached No. 60, whilst his album The Unlikely Lad was released as a digital download in August 2005. The album includes three songs co-written with Amy Winehouse, who also features on the track "Best for Me".

In August 2005, James was supposed to perform at the V Festival, but cancelled due to 'unforeseeable circumstances'. Later that year he toured with McFly, but due to the disappointing chart performance of "Your Woman", James was dropped by Island Records and his debut album was not released on CD at the time. The album was later released on CD on 2 July 2012, following his success on The Voice.

2012–: The Voice UK, A Place I Go and My Amy: The Life We Shared

In 2012, James auditioned for The Voice UK, appearing in the third of four 'Blind Audition' shows. With coaches will.i.am, Jessie J, Tom Jones and Danny O'Donoghue, James initially performed the track "(Sittin' On) The Dock of the Bay" by Otis Redding. The performance was met with a positive reception from both Jessie J and will.i.am, though it was the latter who opted to have James on his team. During the show's 'Battle Rounds', James was pitted against 25-year-old Heshima Thompson, winning the performance of "Yeah 3x" by Chris Brown and advancing to the live shows. During the first live show, James performed the James Vincent McMorrow version of "Higher Love" by Stevie Winwood, and was saved by judge will.i.am. In the third live show, James performed Terence Trent D'Arby's "Sign Your Name". The performance saw James land in the bottom three alongside Joelle Moses and Frances Wood, though his place in the semi-final was awarded by coach will.i.am. In the semi-final, James performed Queen's "Bohemian Rhapsody" – and was voted into the final by the public over fellow contestant Jaz Ellington; joining Bo Bruce, Leanne Mitchell and Vince Kidd from Team Danny, Team Tom and Team Jessie respectively. In the final, James performed three tracks: "I'll Be There" (The Jackson 5), "OMG" (Usher) with will.i.am and "Higher Love" (James Vincent McMorrow) for a second time. Alongside singer Bo Bruce, James was announced as the series' runner-up behind Leanne Mitchell.

Performances

On Monday 10 December 2012 Tyler achieved a lifelong ambition by featuring on the Ken Bruce show on Radio 2.
The segment of the show is "Tracks of My Years" where the guest is usually a legend of the popular music world and they choose two tracks each day of the show that have huge meaning to themselves.

It was confirmed in July 2012 that James had signed a new joint record deal with Island Records and Universal Music Group and had begun work on his second studio album. James then announced in August that the album's lead single, "Single Tear", would be released in the United Kingdom on 7 October; with the album A Place I Go following on 29 October. James confirmed he had worked with various producers and songwriters for A Place I Go, including The Voice coach will.i.am, Fraser T Smith and Guy Chambers who wrote and produced "Single Tear". The album charted at number 47 on the UK Albums Chart.

In 2015, James starred in the documentary film, Amy that was released in theatres on 3 July about his late friend Amy Winehouse. In 2021, he published My Amy: The Life We Shared , a memoir of his relationship with Winehouse.

Personal life

James grew up in the Canning Town area of London and moved to Camden Town with Amy Winehouse in his late teens where they lived together until her death. James met Winehouse at the age of 13 when they both trained at the Sylvia Young Theatre School.

Discography

Studio albums
 The Unlikely Lad (2005)
 A Place I Go (2012)

Filmography
Amy (2015)

Bibliography
''My Amy: The Life We Shared (2021)

References

1982 births
Living people
English pop singers
British contemporary R&B singers
English male singer-songwriters
People from Canning Town
The Voice UK contestants
Musicians from London
21st-century English singers
21st-century British male singers
English memoirists
Amy Winehouse
Island Records artists
Polydor Records artists